Chris Crawford on Game Design is a book about computer and video game design by Chris Crawford. Although referred to as the second edition of The Art of Computer Game Design, it is in fact a completely new book. It was published by Peachpit under the New Riders imprint in 2003. It includes Crawford's response to recent game developments, such as The Sims, and dedicates a chapter to each of his first 14 published games: Tanktics, Legionnaire, Wizard, Energy Czar, Scram, Eastern Front (1941), Gossip, Excalibur, Balance of Power, Patton Versus Rommel, Siboot, The Global Dilemma: Guns & Butter, Balance of the Planet and Patton Strikes Back.

See also
List of books on computer and video games
People games

External links
Peachpit's catalog entry for Chris Crawford on Game Design
Chris Crawford on Game Design on Google Book Search

2003 non-fiction books
Video game culture
Books about video games
Video game design